This is the discography of Wax Trax! Records.

Wax Trax Records (1980-1992)

Wax Trax/TVT Records (1993-2000)

See also
 Wax Trax
 List of record labels

References

Discographies of American record labels